Habiba Ahmed Abd Elaziz Ramadan (November 22, 1986 – August 14, 2013) was an Egyptian journalist and activist who was killed on August 14, 2013 at the August 2013 Rabaa massacre by a sniper in the protests following the ousting of Mohamed Morsi as President of Egypt.

At the time of her death she was working for Gulf News.

She had a substantial following on Facebook with more than 34,000 followers.

A charity fundraising campaign was set up by some of her friends through Charity: water. A video was also created for the campaign describing Habiba and encouraging people to donate.

References

1986 births
2013 deaths
Deaths by firearm in Egypt